A workflow management system (WfMS or WFMS) provides an infrastructure for the set-up, performance and monitoring of a defined sequence of tasks, arranged as a workflow application.

International standards
There are several international standards-setting bodies in the field of workflow management:
 Workflow Management Coalition
 World Wide Web Consortium
 Organization for the Advancement of Structured Information Standards
 WS-BPEL 2.0 (integration-centric) and WS-BPEL4People (human task-centric) published by OASIS Standards Body.

The underlying theoretical basis of workflow management is the mathematical concept of a Petri net.

Each of the workflow models has tasks (nodes) and dependencies between the nodes. Tasks are activated when the dependency conditions are fulfilled.

Workflows for people
WfMS allow the user to define different workflows for different types of jobs or processes. For example, in a manufacturing setting, a design document might be automatically routed from designer to a technical director to the production engineer. At each stage in the workflow, one individual or group is responsible for a specific task. Once the task is complete, WfMS ensures that the individuals responsible for the next task are notified and receive the data they need to execute their stage of the process.

Workflows can also have more complex dependencies; for example if a document is to be translated into several languages, a translation manager could select the languages and each selection would then be activated as a work order form for a different translator. Only when all the translators have completed their respective tasks would the next task in the process be activated. It is process management from top level to lower level.

WfMS also automate redundant tasks and ensure that uncompleted tasks are followed up.
A key standard that deals with human tasks in workflows is the WS-BPEL4People Standard by the OASIS Standards Body.

Automated workflows
WfMS may control automated processes in addition to replacing paper work order transfers.

For example, if the above design documents are now available as AutoCAD but the workflow requires them as Catia, then an automated process would implement the conversion prior to notifying the individual responsible for the next task. This is the concept of enterprise application integration.

WfMS also appear in distributed IT environments such as grid computing or cloud computing. The aim of such systems is to manage the execution of various processes that may belong to the same application while in many cases they are used as a means to guarantee the offered quality of service (QoS).

WfMS may also be enhanced by using existing enterprise infrastructure such as Microsoft Outlook or Office 365.

Categories
Components or subsystems of WfMS can be categorized into the following categories:
Routing system (traffic policemen)
This is the basic function of a WfMS. It conduces to the routing of the flow of information or document flow, it transmits the information from one work item to the next one. This feature will not respond to exceptional circumstances.
Distribution system (cox)
This function is an expansion. It detects exceptional circumstances and transmits the information to designated work positions. With a dynamic assignment, it can assign new tasks to underworked positions, to achieve a continuation or a balance of workload within the workflow.
Coordination system (foreman)
This function coordinates concurrent activities, to prevent resource conflicts or priority conflicts.
Agent system (labourer)
This function does legwork automatically. This relieves the executing instance of operations which need no decisions.
Assistant system (expert)
This feature extends the previous features to a process adjustment instance and for proposals for further actions. The basics are methods of artificial intelligence.

Functional categorization
Workflow systems can be categorized in the following categories based on their functionalities: 
 Integration-centric workflow systems
 Human task-centric workflow systems
 XCFG

List of notable WfMS

 Activiti
 Apache ODE
 Apache Taverna
 Apache Airflow
 Appian
 Bizagi
 Bonita BPM
 Camunda
 CEITON 
 Collective Knowledge
 Cuneiform
 IBM BPM
 Imixs-Workflow
 QuickBase
 jBPM
 PRPC
 ProActive
 Pyrus
 Qntrl
 RedBooth Workflow Management
 Salesforce.com Process Workflow
 ServiceNow Platform
 SAP Business Workflow
 TACTIC
 Windows Workflow Foundation
 WorkflowGen
 YAWL

Built-in WfMS as part of the function

See also
 Collaborative software#Collaborative management (coordination) tools
 Workflow

References

Workflow technology